Tjølling is a former municipality in Vestfold county, Norway. Tjølling was established as a municipality January 1, 1838 (see formannskapsdistrikt). Together with Brunlanes, Stavern and Hedrum, it was merged into Larvik on January 1, 1988.
 Tjølling had 7,878 residents at one point, as well as an area of 70km². 

Tjøllingvollen is currently a village and a town that was the municipal center in the then Tjølling municipality.

Geography and demography 
Tjølling includes the 69,5 km² area between Numedalslågen and Sandefjordsfjorden, south of E18.

There's some agriculture and numerous quarries excavating of larvikite in Tjølling. The biggest quarry is Klåstad, which extracts a type of larvikite called Mørk Labrador (English: Dark Labrador).

Tjølling has a long coastline with many fine beaches and coves. Tjølling is also known as a popular cottage area, as well as a popular holiday area. The most popular ports are Ula and Kjerringvik. Viksfjord is an idyllic sidefjord to Larviksfjorden, and is located in Tjølling.

Population 
Historic numbers show that Tjøllings population grew from the early 19th century until the municipal merger in 1988.

History
Tjølling is the site of one of the oldest Viking Era settlements within Scandinavia. Kaupang was a big trading centre for the Vikings. Kaupang is considered to be Norway's first city, being mentioned by Ohthere of Hålogaland when he visited Alfred the great around year 890. 

There have been several earlier archaeological surveys and excavations at Kaupang. In 1867 antiquarian Nicolay Nicolaysen mapped one of the grave-fields around the former town and  excavated 79 grave mounds. He uncovered a cremation cemetery, largely dated to the 10th century. Charlotte Blindheim (1917-2005) started excavating in 1947 and completed her last publication in 1999. In 1997, Dagfinn Skre and his associates from the University of Oslo undertook a new program of work at Kaupang followed by a large excavation that ran over three years, from 2000 till 2002. Most recently it has been the site of post-excavation work conducted by the University of Oslo.

Tjøllingvollen 
Tjøllingvollen is placed at the highest part of the outer raet. Tjøllings administrative and religious center has been here since pagan times. 

Vollen is currently a well developed rural area, with a grocery store, kindergarten, post office, primary and secondary school, health and elderly institutions, among others. 

During the 1960- and 70s, the residential area of Vollen was expanded. There has been large construction activity in the area in the past few years.

Education and sports 
Tjodalyng school is a primary and secondary school, with around 520 students and 60 employees. The principal of the school is Terje Berglie. The school was built as a primary school in 1963, but was expanded as a secondary school in 1976. 

Tjølling IF was founded in 1888, and is located at Løveskogen Idrettspark. They operate also Tjøllinghallen, which is located in the same area. The club also disposes of artificial turf pitches, a grass pitch, two peach pitches and a clubhouse. The club has 27 fotball teams, where nine of those are women's teams, and 18 are men's teams. They also have 18 children's teams, six youth teams, three adult teams, and 23 coaches.

The sports association has other activities as well, like "allis" for kids between 2-7 years old, and activities for former members. There's also Tjøllingmila and Vestfold Maraton, which they arrange.

Tjølling Church

Tjølling Church (Tjølling kirke) at Larvik in Vestfold was originally constructed as a medieval stone church in the 12th century. 

The church was hit by a fire in 1360  and was then rebuilt. An earthquake damaged the church in the 1750s. It has been speculated that it was the 1755 Lisbon earthquake, but it's more plausible that it was an earthquake in Kattegat in 1759 that caused the damages. It was rebuilt from 1762 to 1767 as a Romanesque church with interiors from different eras. The restoration in 1860 gave Tjølling church its present appearance.

Name
The site was apparently the location of a Thing for the district long before the introduction of Christianity. The municipality (originally the parish) is named after  the old church site (Tjølling kyrkje). The Old Norse form of the name was Þjóðarlyng. The first element is the genitive case of þjóð f 'crowd of people; assembly', the last element is lyng n 'heather' (here in the sense 'heath, moor').

References

Other sources
Blindheim, Charlotte (1972) Kaupang: Vikingenes Handelsplass (Mortensen: Universitets oldsaksamling) 
Helle, K. et al.,  (2006) Norsk Byhistorie (Pax forlag, Oslo) 
Krohn-Holm, Jan W. (1970) Tjølling bygdebok  (Tjølling Kommune:3 volumes) 
Skre, Dagfinn  (2007)  Kaupang in Skiringssal (Kaupang Excavation Project Publication Series) 
Skre, Dagfinn; Stylegar Frans-Arne, (2008)  Kaupang the Viking town (Jac Trykk as, Oslo)

External links
Tjølling kirke - Larvik

Former municipalities of Norway
1838 establishments in Norway
Populated places established in 1838
Populated places disestablished in 1988
Larvik